Adam Scanlon (born 1996) is a Massachusetts politician from North Attleborough who represents the 14th Bristol district in the Massachusetts House of Representatives.

Personal life
Scanlon was raised in North Attleborough. He received a BA from Framingham State University and is pursuing a master's degree in Public Administration at Northeastern University. He is openly gay.

Political career
Scanlon first entered local government as a member of the North Attleboro Town Meeting from 2015-2019. He also served on the North Attleborough School Committee from 2017-2019 and was a member of the North Attleboro Town Council from 2019–2020. In the 2020 election, Scanlon defeated fellow Town Councilor John Simmons to win the Massachusetts House of Representatives seat held by retiring incumbent Betty Poirier.

Committees 
 House Committee on Bonding, Capital Expenditures and State Assets
 Joint Committee on Community Development and Small Businesses
 Joint Committee on the Judiciary

Electoral History
In 2022 Scanlon went unopposed in both the Democratic Primary and General Election.

See also
 2021–2022 Massachusetts legislature

References

Democratic Party members of the Massachusetts House of Representatives
Living people
Gay politicians
LGBT state legislators in Massachusetts
21st-century LGBT people
1997 births